The bluegrass darter (Etheostoma jimmycarter) is a fish found in the Green River drainage in Kentucky and Tennessee.

It was named after the 39th president of the United States Jimmy Carter for his environmental leadership and accomplishments in the areas of national energy policy and wilderness protection, and his lifelong commitment to social justice and basic human rights.

See also
 List of organisms named after famous people (born 1900–1949)

References

Freshwater fish of the United States
Etheostoma
Taxa named by Steven R. Layman
Taxa named by Richard L. Mayden
Fish described in 2012